Rebecca Wisocky (born November 12, 1971) is an American actress. Best known for her role as Evelyn Powell in the Lifetime comedy-drama series Devious Maids (2013–16), as of 2021 she is starring as Hetty Woodstone on the CBS sitcom Ghosts.

Early life
Wisocky was born in York, Pennsylvania. She began her acting career in York at York Little Theatre, a community theater, where she said she spent most of her childhood. She also attended the Pennsylvania Governor's School for the Arts. Wisocky later moved to New York City, and graduated from the New York University Experimental Theatre Wing.

Career
Wisocky began work in the theatre, appearing on Broadway in 1995 in The Play's the Thing. Wisocky later performed in many stage productions, primarily playing strong women, like Lady Macbeth and Medea. In 2008, she won the Obie Award for Distinguished Performance by an Actress for her role as Nazi-era German filmmaker Leni Riefenstahl in Jordan Harrison's Amazons and Their Men. She also acted in several other Off-Broadway plays, including Don Juan Comes Back from the War, The Tooth of Crime, and Hot 'N Throbbing.

Wisocky had supporting roles in number of films, including Pollock (2000), Funny Money (2006), and Atlas Shrugged: Part I (2011). She made her television debut in 2000, on an episode of HBO comedy Sex and the City. In later years, she also guest starred on Law & Order, Law & Order: Criminal Intent, Law & Order: Special Victims Unit, The Sopranos, NCIS, Bones, Emma Smith in Big Love, and as Queen Mab on True Blood. Wisocky had a recurring roles in the CW series 90210 from 2010 to 2011, CBS's The Mentalist (2010-2013) as Brenda Shettrick, and in the first season of FX series American Horror Story as Lorraine Harvey.

In early 2012, Marc Cherry cast Wisocky in his comedy-drama television pilot Devious Maids as Evelyn Powell, the main antagonist of the show. Previously, she played Bree's Mother on Desperate Housewives (episode "Women and Death"). The series was originally in development to air on ABC, but not picked. In June 2012, Lifetime picked up the pilot with a thirteen-episode order to air in early 2013. Wisocky received positive reviews from critics for her performance in the series. In 2014, Wisocky had guest-starring roles in the ABC dramas Castle and Once Upon a Time. In 2015, she appeared opposite Sally Field in the comedy-drama film, Hello, My Name Is Doris, directed by Michael Showalter. The following years, Wisocky appeared on The X-Files, The Sinner, Modern Family, 9-1-1, For All Mankind, and Star Trek: Picard. In 2021, she began starring as Hetty Woodstone, the deceased lady of the manor, on the CBS comedy series, Ghosts.

Personal life
On January 5, 2015, Wisocky became engaged to Lap Chi Chu, a theatrical lighting designer, on the Pont de la Tournelle in Paris. They married in Boston on October 10, 2015.

Filmography

Film

Television

Theatre
God's Ear as Lenora (Vineyard Theatre)
Amazons and Their Men as Leni Riefenstahl (Clubbed Thumb)
Hot'n'Throbbing as VO (Signature)
Medea in Jerusalem as Medea (Rattlestick)
Tatjana in Color as Wally (Culture Project)
Antigone as Creon (Classic Stage Company)
The Squirrel as Jessica (SPF)
The Bitter Tears of Petra von Kant as Petra (Henry Miller Theatre)
Sueno as Estrella (MCC)
Middle Finger as Myrna (Ma-Yi)
A Tale of Two Cities as Madame Defarge (Culture Project)
Hot Keys as Calitha (P.S. 122)
Tooth of Crime as Becky Lou (Second Stage/Signature)
36 Views as Elizabeth (NYSF/The Public)

References

External links
 
 
 
 

1971 births
20th-century American actresses
21st-century American actresses
Actresses from Pennsylvania
American film actresses
American soap opera actresses
American stage actresses
American television actresses
Living people
Obie Award recipients
People from York, Pennsylvania
Tisch School of the Arts alumni